Uele may refer to:

Uele River, a river in the Democratic Republic of the Congo
Uele (Yakutia), a river in Russia
Uélé Province, a former province of the Democratic Republic of the Congo
Bas-Uélé
Haut-Uélé
Uele District, former district in Congo Free State